Gulf of Oman incident may refer to:

 May 2019 Gulf of Oman incident
 June 2019 Gulf of Oman incident
 July 2021 Gulf of Oman incident
 August 2021 Gulf of Oman incident